A North-South Wales railway, also known as Traws Link Cymru is a proposed rail service line that would link North and South Wales via a western rail line from Swansea to Bangor. This includes re-opening the and the Bangor-Afon Wen line.

Traws Link Cymru (Swansea-Bangor line) 
The campaign group, Traws Link Cymru was founded in 2013 and its aim is to reopen the Aberystwyth-Carmarthen and Afon Wen-Bangor rail lines which were closed as part of the Beeching cuts in the 1960s. Since those cuts, travel between Carmarthen and Bangor takes a six-hour journey that must go outside Wales and through Hereford, Shrewsbury and Crewe.

In March 2020, the campaign group gained media attention following campaigning for several years to re-open the line south from Aberystwyth to Carmarthen and a £300,000 feasibility study was carried out. Spokesman Elfed Wyn Jones stated, "Reopening the railway would benefit villages and towns along the track and by reinstating the line between Afon-wen and Bangor, as well as reopening the line between Aberystwyth and Carmarthen, would create a rail network within Wales, between the North and the South, rather than travelling for extra hours and distance through England to complete the journey."

An agreement between Plaid Cymru and the Labour Welsh Government was made which included transport in Wales, and would “ask Transport for Wales and other partners to explore how transport links between the north and south of Wales can be developed”. The agreement would also explore “how to protect potential travel corridors along the western coast of Wales from Swansea to Bangor”.

Proposed Carmarthern-Aberyswyth line re-opening 

Official talks of reopening started in 2014 when First Minister Carwyn Jones shared his support towards the reopening, and it was adopted as an official policy of the Welsh Liberal Democrats. The next two years were followed by support from Carmarthenshire County Council, Ceredigion County Council, the Minister for  Science, Economy and Transport (Welsh Government) and Plaid Cymru. Official talks and meetings included Stephen Crabb MP, Secretary of State for Wales and James Price, Director General, Economy, Science and Transport (Welsh Government) shortly followed by the AECOM report. 

In October 2016, the Welsh government announced it would be allocating £300,000 towards funding a feasibility report into re-opening the railway as part of the draft 2017–18 budget. The study is being carried out by engineering consultancy, Mott MacDonald and began in September 2017. Subsequently, Ken Skates, the Welsh Transport Minister consulted the Secretary of State for Transport, Grant Shapps, explaining that the reopening of the line was important to revitalise the Welsh economy following the COVID-19 pandemic.

In October 2018, the Welsh Government published the full feasibility study which showed that there were no major obstacles to reopening and that the project would cost up to £775m although this was subject to a number of unknown further costs being determined such as the crossing of Trawscoed Bog. In September 2020, this was revised to £620 million by the campaign group Traws Link Cymru. The group's report concluded that 97% of the original trackbed was already clear and that reopening the line is realistic.

In 2022, the Welsh government's National Transport Delivery Plan suggested that the case for a rail link between the south of Wales and Aberystwyth could be made by 2025 and the plan and design drawn up by 2027. The document also suggested that planning could continue beyond that point.

In December 2022, former Ceredigion MP and leader of Welsh Liberal Democrats, Mark Williams said that an Aberystwyth-Carmarthen rail link could be a major factor in keeping young people and skilled workers and build up the economy in the area.

Proposed Bangor-Afon Wen reopening 
In November 2020, regional MS Llyr Gruffydd described the “gaping hole” in rail infrastructure and that re-opening the rail link between Bangor and Afon Wen would “help integrate public transport in Gwynedd and down the western coast of Wales.”

In 2021, a report by the Welsh government showed a green arrow pointing southwards from Bangor to Afon Wen. This was interpreted by the campaign group "Traws Link Cymru" that Afon Wen to Bangor or a part of the route is now being considered as part of a "North Wales Metro".

See also 

 Carmarthen–Aberystwyth line
 Carnarvonshire Railway
 List of movements in Wales
 Transport for Wales Rail
 Transport for Wales
 West Wales

References 

Proposed rail infrastructure in Wales